The Silesian Planetarium also Silesian Planetarium and Astronomical Observatory is the largest and oldest planetarium  in Poland. It was founded on 4 December 1955 to commemorate the great astronomer Nicolaus Copernicus.  It is located in the Silesian Central Park, on the boundary between the Katowice and Chorzów districts of the Upper Silesian Metropolitan Union.

Facilities
The Planetarium's 23-meter dome can seat some four hundred spectators viewing projections of the sky from both analogue and digital planetarium projectors. It hosts regular public shows on astronomical topics as well as a variety of other events. In 2011 it hosted the fifth International Olympiad on Astronomy and Astrophysics.
	
The Planetarium's sister astronomical observatory is equipped with a 300-mm diameter refracting telescope (the largest refractor in use in Poland) and a number of smaller instruments. On cloudless days, visitors can view live images of the Sun and, after dusk, a range of celestial objects at a magnification of up to 750 times. 

The observatory conducts research on comets and minor planets. The Planetarium has an astronomical library of some 10,000 volumes and, in the courtyard, an impressive sundial. The corridors host astronomy-related exhibits.

The Planetarium's meteorological and seismological stations conduct regular observations and host educational classes.

See also
 Biały Słoń on Pip Ivan

External links

 Website Silesian Planetarium
 Website panoramical photos of Silesian Planetarium

Planetaria in Poland
Astronomical observatories in Poland
Buildings and structures in Katowice
Buildings and structures in Chorzów
Astronomy in Poland
Tourist attractions in Katowice